Fonab Castle, also known as Port-na-Craig House, is located in Pitlochry, Perth and Kinross, Scotland.

History
Built in 1892 for Lieutenant Colonel George Glas Sandeman, and now a Category B listed building. In 1946, the building became the property of the North of Scotland Hydro-Electric Board, who changed the property's name from Fonab Castle to Port-na-Craig House. The castle was altered internally in 1954.

The building lay empty for many years, and was listed on the Buildings at Risk Register for Scotland.

As a hotel
The hotel has a fine-dining restaurant of three AA rosettes, and 43 guest bedrooms.

In 2022, the property was sold, via a Savills auction, to Fonab SPV.

References

External links

Castles in Perth and Kinross
Listed castles in Scotland
Listed buildings in Pitlochry
Category B listed buildings in Perth and Kinross
Buildings and structures completed in 1892
1892 establishments in Scotland
Hotels in Perth and Kinross